HBF may refer to:
 HBF Health Fund, an Australian health insurance fund
 Perth Superdrome, in Perth, Western Australia known for sponsorship reasons as HBF Stadium
 Arena Joondalup, in Joondalup, Western Australia known for sponsorship reasons as HBF Arena
 Perth Oval, in Perth, Western Australia known for sponsorships reasons as HBF Park
 Hauptbahnhof (Hbf), German for central railway station
 Hemoglobin F (HbF), or fetal hemoglobin
 Human Betterment Foundation, a eugenics organization established in 1928 by E.S. Gosney
 Hepatitis B Foundation, biomedical research foundation 
 Home Builders Federation, a trade association